Ricky Petrucciani (born 30 June 2000) is a Swiss sprinter specialising in the 400 metres. He represented his country at the 2019 and 2021 European Indoor Championships reaching the semifinals on the second occasion. In addition he won a bronze medal at the 2019 European U20 Championships. He also obtained a Silver medal at the 2022 European Championships in the 400m category.

International competitions

Personal bests
Outdoor
100 metres – 10.37 (0.0 m/s, Regensdorf 2020)
200 metres – 21.03 (+0.4 m/s, Langenthal 2020)
400 metres – 45.02 (Tallinn 2021, NU23R)
Indoor
60 metres – 6.71 (Magglingen 2021)
200 metres – 21.50 (Magglingen 2021)
400 metres – 46.72 (Toruń 2021)

References

External links
Official site

2000 births
Living people
Swiss male sprinters
People from  Locarno
Athletes (track and field) at the 2020 Summer Olympics
Olympic athletes of Switzerland
Sportspeople from Ticino
European Athletics Championships medalists